Absolute Software Corporation is an AmericanCanadian company that provides products and services in the fields of endpoint security and zero trust security. The company is headquartered in Vancouver, British Columbia, Canada. Regional offices include: Victoria, British Columbia, Canada; Austin, Texas; Ankeny, Iowa; Boulder, Colorado; San Jose, California; and Seattle, Washington in the U.S.; and in Reading, UK; and Ho Chi Minh City, Vietnam. Absolute is a publicly traded company on the Toronto Stock Exchange (TSX) and Nasdaq.

History

Founded in 1993 in Vancouver, British Columbia, Canada, Absolute developed a product to manage, track and secure computers regardless of the physical location of devices.

In 2000, Absolute became a publicly traded company on the Toronto Stock Exchange (TSX).

In 2005, Persistence technology by Absolute was embedded for the first time into the firmware or BIOS of a computer. This was the start of an ongoing partnership with most major original equipment manufacturers (OEMs) where Absolute technology ships with the hardware from the factory.

Absolute's office in Europe was first established in November 2006, in Newbury, UK. In July 2009, a second regional office was opened in Austin, Texas, to serve as a base for Absolute's U.S.-based sales team.

In 2007, Microsoft awarded Absolute gold certified partner status in the Microsoft Partner Ecosystem,

In December 2009, Absolute announced its acquisition of the LANrev product suite, a computer systems management software application, from Pole Position Software. Following the acquisition, the product suite was rebranded as Absolute Asset Management, and eventually renamed as Absolute Manage.

In November 2012, Absolute acquired the assets of LiveTime Software, a privately held helpdesk and IT Service Support Management (ITSSM) provider. LiveTime assets were officially relaunched as part of Absolute's expanded product suite in January 2013 as Absolute Service, an IT Service Management (ITSM) tool. Absolute Service received PinkVERIFY ITIL 3 Certification from Pink Elephant.

Absolute was listed in the Gartner Inc. Magic Quadrant for client management tools from 2012 to 2014, and was positioned in the Niche quadrants of the Magic Quadrant for Mobile Device Management Software and the Magic Quadrant for Content-Aware Data Loss Prevention in 2013.

In June 2013, Absolute acquired Palisade Systems, a privately-held provider of data loss prevention (DLP) technologies.

In October 2013, Absolute launched a student and device protection initiative called Absolute Safe Schools, which educates students and staff of participating schools on the safe use of mobile devices and provides assistance in the event of device loss and theft.

In December 2013, John Livingston stepped down as chief executive officer and as a member of the board of directors at Absolute. On June 13, 2014, Geoff Haydon was appointed CEO and director .

Absolute renamed Computrace to Data and Device Security (DDS) and refocused its business model in 2015.

The company sold its Absolute Manage and Absolute Service products to HEAT Software in October 2015.

On November 2, 2018, Christy Wyatt was appointed CEO and director. She was named “New CEO of the Year” by the Globe and Mail in 2020. Business and technology news organizations have interviewed Wyatt on cyber security topics including ransomware, the zero trust security model, and the trend toward remote work during the COVID 19 pandemic.

In January 2020, Absolute was listed by Forbes in a list of cybersecurity companies.

Absolute acquired NetMotion Software, a private company specializing in network security and virtual private networks, in 2021.

Products and services
The Absolute software platform, formerly known as Data and Device Security (embedded into firmware of most computers, tablets, and smartphones at the factory), consists of several components organized into three product lines: Secure Endpoint, Secure Access, and Application Persistence-as-a-Service.

The Secure Endpoint line enables users to monitor and address laptop problems. Its components include Absolute Visibility, Absolute Control, and Absolute Resilience. The company added Absolute Ransomware Response in April 2022.

The Secure Access line provides network connectivity for users to gain access to resources in the cloud, private data centers, or on-premises. These products allow users to transition to a zero trust approach. The line includes Absolute VPN, Absolute ZTNA, and Absolute Insights for Network.

In November 2021, Absolute launched the Application Persistence-as-a-Service (APaaS) product line.

A core component of all three lines is Absolute Persistence, which allows always-on connection to the endpoint. Furthermore, the products' "self-healing" client can reinstall itself if tampered with.  Persistence technology is embedded in more than half a billion devices.

Partnerships

Absolute has ongoing partnerships with many OEMs globally, who embed Persistence technology by Absolute into the firmware of their devices at the factory. Strategic partnerships include Dell, Lenovo, Hewlett-Packard, and Samsung. Dell was one of Absolute's early customers before becoming a supplier for Absolute. President of Dell Canada, Kevin Peesker noted that Dell has "been able to be there with them providing them scalable infrastructure" as Absolute has grown. This has allowed Absolute to "be very efficient in scaling out their business" from a Vancouver base on a global level.

Absolute has also built a network of partnerships with resellers, distributors and in-country partners such as CDW, PCM, Insight and InTechnology.

Aligning with other technology companies, Absolute has worked closely with leading operating system providers and chipset manufacturers and has collaborated with recognized security companies to create complementary technologies and services.

Since 2007, Absolute has maintained its Gold Certified Partner Status in the Microsoft Partner Program. Through this partnership, Absolute incorporated security reporting functionality for Microsoft System Center Configuration Manager (SCCM) into Absolute DDS, a feature that became available in mid-2015.

In August 2015, Absolute joined the RSA Ready Technology Partnership program, run by the Security Division of EMC, creating interoperability between Absolute DDS and RSA Security Analytics, an advanced threat detection and forensics platform.

Other alliance partnerships include Advanced Micro Devices (AMD), Qualcomm, Verizon, and Follett.

References 

Companies based in Vancouver
Software companies of Canada
Software companies established in 1993
Companies listed on the Toronto Stock Exchange
Canadian brands